The Spirit of Culver is a 1939 drama starring Jackie Cooper and Freddie Bartholomew. Directed by Joseph Santley and written by Whitney Bolton and Nathanael West, the film is a remake of 1932's Tom Brown of Culver.

Plot
Tom Allen, the son of a decorated war hero who is feared to have died in battle, wins a scholarship to the Culver Military Academy. His arrogance and unwillingness to comply with the academy's strict rules soon gets him in trouble, but through the help of his roommate he gets by.

Cast
 Jackie Cooper as Tom Allen 
 Freddie Bartholomew as Bob Randolph 
 Andy Devine as Tubby 
 Henry Hull as Doctor Allen 
 Jackie Moran as Perkins 
 Tim Holt as Captain Wilson 
 Gene Reynolds as Carruthers 
 Kathryn Kane as June Macy 
 Walter Tetley as Hank 
 Pierre Watkin as Captain Wharton 
 John Hamilton as Major White

Production
Filming took place partly at Culver Military Academy. Tim Holt had been a student there.

References

External links

 New York Times review

1939 films
American black-and-white films
1930s English-language films
Films directed by Joseph Santley
Universal Pictures films
Films with screenplays by Nathanael West
1939 drama films
Films scored by Frank Skinner
American drama films
1930s American films